The Cima Bianca is a mountain of the Lepontine Alps, overlooking Giornico in the canton of Ticino. On the northern side lies a small lake named Laghetto.

References

External links
 Cima Bianca on Hikr

Mountains of the Alps
Mountains of Switzerland
Mountains of Ticino
Lepontine Alps